Alan Plavin (born 2 June 1993) is a Lithuanian male badminton player. He won the men's singles silver medal at the 2013 Maccabiah Games. In the final, he was defeated by Misha Zilberman of Israel. He won bronze in the men's singles and the men's doubles at the 2022 Maccabiah Games.

Achievements

BWF International Challenge/Series
Men's Doubles

 BWF International Challenge tournament
 BWF International Series tournament
 BWF Future Series tournament

References

External links
 

1993 births
Living people
Sportspeople from Vilnius
Lithuanian male badminton players
European Games competitors for Lithuania
Badminton players at the 2015 European Games
Competitors at the 2013 Maccabiah Games
Maccabiah Games silver medalists for Lithuania
Competitors at the 2017 Maccabiah Games
Competitors at the 2022 Maccabiah Games
Maccabiah Games medalists in badminton